Frederick Starr (January 23, 1826 – January 8, 1867) was an American clergyman and abolitionist.

About 
Starr, the second son of Frederick and Sarah Starr, of Rochester, New York, was born in that city, January 23, 1826. He had united, at the age of ten, with the First Presbyterian Church in Rochester.

He graduated from Yale College in 1846. He turned to preparation for the ministry immediately upon leaving college. After three years in the Auburn Theological Seminary, in 1850 he visited Missouri, laboring for a few weeks in St. Louis as a city missionary, and for some months with the Presbyterian Church in Weston. Toward the end of the same year he was ordained pastor of this church. His location, on the western border of the state, but four miles from Fort Leavenworth, exposed him to the agitation concerning the repeal of the Missouri Compromise, and the Kansas Border War. Finally, after varied persecution, his declared conviction that slavery was morally wrong obliged him to leave the town  in the Spring of 1855 to avoid violence.

The next seven years he passed in Western New York, as agent of the Western Education Society, and of Auburn Theological Seminary. Resigning the former of these positions in April, 1862, he took charge of the Presbyterian church in Penn Yan, New York, over which he was installed June 12. From April, 1865, until his death, he was pastor of the North Presbyterian Church in St. Louis. He was married, in 1850, to Helen, daughter of Prof. Henry Mills, D. D., of Auburn; she survives him, with children. Mr. Starr was the author of a pamphlet, published anonymously, in 1853, entitled Letters for the People, on the Present Crisis, (52 pages, 8vo.) which contained nine letters written from St. Louis, and discussing the influence of slavery upon the opening of Nebraska Territory and the building of the Pacific Railroad. This pamphlet had, it is believed, a wide influence. He also published a sermon on President Lincoln's death.

He died in St. Louis, Missouri, of a fever, induced by overwork, January 8, 1867, aged 41 years.

References

External links

 

1826 births
1867 deaths
Religious leaders from Rochester, New York
Yale College alumni
Auburn Theological Seminary alumni
American Presbyterian ministers
American abolitionists
Activists from Rochester, New York
American religious writers
Presbyterian abolitionists
19th-century American clergy